Richard Clarke may refer to:

Government and politics
 Richard Clarke (MP), Member of Parliament for Lynn in 1584
 Richard A. Clarke (born 1950), retired U.S. government official, expert in counter-terrorism, and author
 Richard Henry Clarke (1843–1906), U.S. Representative from Alabama
 Richard W. B. Clarke (1910–1975), UK civil servant

Sports
 Richard Clarke (boxer) (born 1963), Jamaican boxer
 Richard Clarke (footballer, born 1979), Northern Irish football manager
 Richard Clarke (footballer born 1985), Northern Irish footballer with Newry City & Glentoran, see 2008–09 Irish League Cup
 Richard Clarke (rugby league), rugby league footballer of the 1980s and 1990s
 Richard Clarke (sailor) (born 1968), Canadian Olympic yacht racer
 Ricardo Clark (born 1983), American soccer player

Religion
 Richard Clarke (priest) (died 1634), English Anglican vicar, on the committee translating the King James version of the Bible
 J. Richard Clarke (born 1927), leader in the Church of Jesus Christ of Latter-day Saints
 Richard Clarke (bishop) (born 1949), Church of Ireland bishop

Others
 Richard Clarke (actor), in films such as Notorious (1946)
 Richard Clarke (frontiersman) (1845–1930), English frontiersman and scout in the United States; inspiration for character Deadwood Dick
 Richard Clarke (merchant) (1711–1795), Boston merchant and Loyalist, father-in-law of John Singleton Copley
 Richard Clarke (radio personality) (born 1978), radio presenter on 95.8 Capital FM and The Big Top 40 Show
 Richard D. Clarke, United States Army general

See also
 Richard Clark (disambiguation)
 Dick Clark (disambiguation)
 Richard Clerke (disambiguation)